The 2018–19 Stephen F. Austin Ladyjacks basketball team represented Stephen F. Austin University during the 2018–19 NCAA Division I women's basketball season. The Ladyjacks were led by fourth year head coach Mark Kellogg and played their home games at the William R. Johnson Coliseum. They are members of the Southland Conference.

The Ladyjacks finished the 2018–19 season 25–7, 16–2 in Southland play to finish in second place. They lost to Texas A&M–Corpus Christi in the semifinal round of the Southland women's tournament. They received an at-large bid to the WNIT where they lost in the first round to UT Arlington.

Previous season
The Ladyjacks finished the 2017–18 season 25–7, 12–6 in Southland play to finish in second place. They advanced to the championship game of the Southland women's tournament where they lost to Nicholls State. They received an at-large bid to the WNIT where they lost in the first round to George Mason.

Roster

Schedule
Sources:

|-
!colspan=9 style=| Non-conference regular season

|-
!colspan=9 style=| Southland Conference regular season

|-
!colspan=9 style=| Southland Women's Tournament

|-
!colspan=9 style=| NIT Tournament

See also
 2018–19 Stephen F. Austin Lumberjacks basketball team

References

Stephen F. Austin Ladyjacks basketball seasons
Stephen F. Austin
Stephen F. Austin Ladyjacks basketball
Stephen F. Austin Ladyjacks basketball
Stephen F. Austin